Ilia Ignatev (born 9 May 1992) is a Kyrgyzstani sailor. He competed at the 2012 Summer Olympics in the Men's Laser class.

References

External links
 

Kyrgyzstani male sailors (sport)
1992 births
Living people
People from Issyk-Kul Region
Kyrgyzstani people of Russian descent
Olympic sailors of Kyrgyzstan
Sailors at the 2012 Summer Olympics – Laser
Sailors at the 2010 Asian Games
Asian Games competitors for Kyrgyzstan